Zevio is a comune (municipality) in the Province of Verona in the Italian region Veneto, located about  west of Venice and about  southeast of Verona.

Zevio borders the following municipalities: Belfiore, Caldiero, Oppeano, Palù, Ronco all'Adige, San Giovanni Lupatoto, and San Martino Buon Albergo.

Twin towns
Zevio is twinned with:

  Arborea, Italy

References

External links
 Official website

Cities and towns in Veneto